Chris Todd (born February 4, 1986) is a former college football quarterback for the Auburn Tigers in 2008 and 2009.  He was Auburn's starting quarterback for part of the 2008 season and for the entire 2009 season.  He set all-time Auburn school records for most touchdown passes in a season and for the longest pass in school history.  He also tied the Auburn single-game record with five touchdown passes against Ball State in 2009.

Early years
Todd played high school football at Elizabethtown High School in Elizabethtown, Kentucky.  During his high school football career, he passed for 10,776 yards and 120 touchdowns.  In 2005, he led Elizabethtown to its first state title in 24 years, as he passed for 3,180 yards and 38 touchdowns.

Todd began his college football career at Texas Tech, where he redshirted in 2005 and appeared in five games in 2006.  In 2007, he played at a junior college.

Auburn

2008 season
In 2008, Todd joined the Auburn Tigers football team as a junior college transfer student.  He gained 248 yards and national media attention for his first career start at Auburn in September 2008.  Todd appeared in seven games for Auburn in 2008, including five as the team's starting quarterback.

2009 season
On August 13, 2009, Todd was named the starter for the 2009 season.  During the 2009 season, he cemented his name into the Auburn record books. In the season opener against Louisiana Tech, Todd connected with wide receiver Terrell Zachary on a 93-yard touchdown strike, which at the time was the longest offensive play in Auburn football history (Cam Newton would connect with receiver Emory Blake on a 94-yard pass during the 2010 season).  In mid-September, he threw four touchdown passes to lead Auburn to a 41-30 victory over  West Virginia.  The following week against Ball State, Todd threw for 284 yards and five touchdowns, with the five touchdowns tying the Auburn single game record for most passing touchdowns in one game. Todd also set the single-season record at Auburn with 22 touchdown passes and finished the season with 2,612 passing yards and a passer rating of 145.73, ranking him 18th in the nation.

References

External links
Auburn Tigers bio
Texas Tech Red Raiders bio

1986 births
Living people
People from Elizabethtown, Kentucky
American football quarterbacks
Texas Tech Red Raiders football players
Auburn Tigers football players
Hutchinson Blue Dragons football players